Donald Chester Zalesky (April 3, 1962 – July 1, 2015), better known by his ring name Curly Moe, was a Canadian-American retired professional wrestler best known for his time in International World Class Championship Wrestling. He was a popular "babyface" in the promotion during the early 1990s, whose gimmick was based on the character Curly Howard from the comedy team The Three Stooges. Bill Apter's 1Wrestling.com has called Curly Moe one of the "silliest characters" in pro wrestling history.

Professional wrestling career
Zalesky trained under Johnny Rodz at "The World's Famous" Gleason's Gym in Brooklyn. Initially wrestling under the name Diesel, Zalesky's trainer changed his ring name several times, including Curly Man Don, before settling on Diesel Don in late 1989. An agile "big man", Zalesky could perform dropkicks and a double leg enzuigiri despite weighing over 500 lbs. He trained with fellow students such as Big Sweet William, Kid Krush, and Mondo Kleen while at the facility. He was also the first-ever opponent of Tommy Dreamer, a future Extreme Championship Wrestling star, who debuted on October 28, 1989.

Zalesky made his pro wrestling debut the following year in International World Class Championship Wrestling. He was brought in by the Savoldi family as a "family friendly" character younger wrestling fans could relate to. His "gimmick" or in-ring persona was based on Curly Howard of The Three Stooges. He not only bore a strong resemblance to Howard but skillfully mimicked his mannerisms both in and outside the ring. His finisher was called the Soitenly Splash and celebrated victories by performing the Curly Shuffle in the center of the ring.

The promotion went so far as to claim he was the real-life nephew of Curly and Moe Howard attracting some attention from the media.  Zalesky was largely used as a comedy act, who antagonized "Boston Bad Boy" Tony Rumble and other IWCCW "heels" with his zany antics, rather than as a serious competitor. In 1991, Zalesky was ranked #445 of the 500 best singles wrestlers in the country by Pro Wrestling Illustrated; he was also interviewed by PWI senior editor Bill Apter on PWI Conference.

Post-retirement
Weighing in at around 600 lbs. during his career, Zalesky retired due to health problems shortly after IWCCW folded. Following his retirement, Zalesky began teaching ESL (English as a Second Language) to adults in Newark, New Jersey; however, his weight continued to increase over the years. In 2005, his weight reached around 730 lbs. and Zalesky underwent a gastric bypass surgery, resulting in a significant weight loss of 340 lbs. In December 2006, after false reports of his death had circulated the internet, Zalesky issued a public statement to editor Bill Apter regarding his life following his retirement and appeared on 1Wrestling.com. The previous month, he had apparently left a message on the online forums of KayfabeMemories.com to dispel the internet rumors. 1Wrestling.com later included Zalesky's "Curly Moe" gimmick as one of the "silliest characters in wrestling" for a special April Fools' Day column in 2010.

Zalesky died to liver cancer on July 1, 2015.

Championships and accomplishments
Pro Wrestling Illustrated
PWI ranked Curly Moe # 445 of the 500 best singles wrestlers of the PWI 500 in 1991

References

Notes

Citations

External links
Curly Moe at Cagematch.net
Curly Moe at Wrestlingdata.com
Professional wrestling record for Curly Moe from The Internet Wrestling Database

Canadian expatriate professional wrestlers in the United States
Professional wrestlers from Quebec
1962 births
2015 deaths
Sportspeople from Saguenay, Quebec
Deaths from cancer in New Jersey
Deaths from liver cancer